Woronora Memorial Park (often referred to as Woronora Cemetery) is a cemetery in Woronora, Sydney, Australia.

History
Woronora Cemetery was established in 1895 with the first burial on 2 April 1895. In 1902 the Devonshire Street Cemetery was closed to make way for Central railway station and some graves were relocated to Woronora. The first cremation occurred in April 1934.

The cemetery is managed by Southern Metropolitan Cemeteries NSW (officially "Southern Metropolitan Cemeteries Land Manager"), consisting of Woronora Memorial Park and Eastern Suburbs Memorial Park, which replaced the Woronora Memorial Park Trust upon gazettal on 3 August 2012.

Crematorium
The original crematorium building, incorporating two chapels and a dual-furnace crematory, was completed in 1934 in the Inter-war Art Deco style by architect Louis Leighton Robertson of Louis S. Robertson & Son, architects, and built by Norman R. Smith, builder of Bexley. Robertson also designed crematoriums in a similar style at Matraville (1938), Kembla Grange (1955), and Beresfield (1936). The crematorium was officially opened on 21 April 1934 by the Colonial Secretary, Frank Chaffey.

In 2018, the 1934 crematorium was decommissioned and a new crematorium able to accommodate the increasing demand for cremations was completed to a design by architects Gardner Wetherill Associates.

Transport
A 750-metre railway line opened on 28 July 1900 branching off the Illawarra railway line at Sutherland terminating at Woronora Cemetery railway station. It closed on 23 May 1947.

Notable people
Notable people interred at Woronora Cemetery include:
 Carl Akhurst, politician
 Henry Bachtold, soldier and railway engineer
 Harry Bath, rugby league
 Tiger Black, rugby league
 Brian Clay, rugby league
 William Matthew Currey, Victoria Cross
 Thomas Dunlea, Catholic priest
 John Patrick Hamilton, Victoria Cross recipient
 Stanley Haviland, public servant
 Frank Jenner, evangelist
 Tom Killiby, rugby league
 Elias C. Laycock, rower
 John Harold Mostyn, rugby league
 Norman Oakes, public servant
 John Radecki, master stained glass artist
 Blair Wark, Victoria Cross recipient

References

External links

Crematoria in Australia
Cemeteries in Sydney
Sutherland Shire
1895 establishments in Australia
Burials at Woronora Memorial Park